Bereg is a rural locality (a village) in Saminskoye Rural Settlement, Vytegorsky District, Vologda Oblast, Russia. The population was 27 as of 2002.

Geography 
Bereg is located 43 km north of Vytegra (the district's administrative centre) by road. Saminsky Pogost is the nearest rural locality.

References 

Rural localities in Vytegorsky District